New Moonta is a rural locality in the Bundaberg Region, Queensland, Australia. In the  New Moonta had a population of 63 people.

History 
New Moonta Provisional School opened in 1904. On 1 January 1909 it became New Moonta State School. It closed in 1926.

In the  New Moonta had a population of 63 people.

References

Further reading 

 

Bundaberg Region
Localities in Queensland